Venedic is a naturalistic constructed language, created by the Dutch translator Jan van Steenbergen (who also co-created the international auxiliary language Interslavic). It is used in the fictional Republic of the Two Crowns, based on the Polish–Lithuanian Commonwealth, in the alternate timeline of Ill Bethisad. Officially, Venedic is a descendant of Vulgar Latin with a strong Slavic admixture, based on the premise that the Roman Empire incorporated the ancestors of the Poles in their territory. Less officially, it tries to show what Polish would have looked like if it had been a Romance instead of a Slavic language. On the Internet, it is well-recognized as an example of the altlang genre, much like Brithenig and Breathanach.

The idea for the language was inspired by such languages as Brithenig and Breathanach, languages that bear a similar relationship to the Celtic languages as Venedic does to Polish. The language itself is based entirely on (Vulgar) Latin and Polish: all phonological, morphological, and syntactic changes that made Polish develop from Common Slavic are applied to Vulgar Latin. As a result, vocabulary and morphology are predominantly Romance in nature, whereas phonology, orthography and syntax are essentially the same as in Polish.

Venedic plays a role in the alternate history of Ill Bethisad, where it is one of the official languages of the Republic of the Two Crowns. In 2005 Venedic underwent a major revision due to a better understanding of Latin and Slavic sound and grammar changes. In the process, the author was assisted by the Polish linguist Grzegorz Jagodziński.

The dictionary on the WWW page linked below contains over 4000 entries.

The language has acquired some media attention in Poland, including several online news articles and an article in the monthly .

Spelling and pronunciation 

Venedic uses the Polish alphabet, which consists of the following 32 letters :

A Ą B C Ć D E Ę F G H I J K L Ł M N Ń O Ó P R S Ś T U W Y Z Ź Ż

Also, there are seven digraphs, representing five phonemes (ch being identical with h, and rz with ż):

Ch Cz Dz Dź Dż Rz Sz

Pronunciation is exactly as in Polish. Stress almost always falls on the penultimate syllable. A preposition and a pronoun are generally treated as one word, and therefore, when the pronoun has only one syllable, the preposition is stressed.

(In theory, the construction of Venedic enables relatively easy construction of other "Slavo-Romance" languages. The Romance "mirror" for Czech, for example, is called "Šležan";  another for Slovak, although somewhat looser than the other two as it uses a partially Hungarian orthography, is called "Slevan". )

Nominals 
Venedic does not have articles. This is a feature that distinguishes Venedic from all natural Romance languages. The reason for this is that Vulgar Latin showed only a rudimentary tendency toward the formation of articles, and they are absent in Polish and most other Slavic languages.

Nouns, pronouns and adjectives can have three genders (masculine, feminine, neuter), two numbers (singular, plural), and three cases:
 the direct case: used for both the subject and the direct object of a sentence. In the sentence: Miej poterz leże libier "My father reads a book", Miej poterz "my father" and libier "a book" are both in the direct case.
 the genitive case: used to indicate possession, for example: siedź potrze "my father's chair", rzejna Anglie "the queen of England".
 the dative case: used to indicate the indirect object of a sentence, for example: Da mi ił libier "Give me that book", Da mi łu "Give it to me".
Venedic also has a vocative case. In most cases it has the same form as the direct case, but there are exceptions: O potrze! "Oh father!" In earlier version of Venedic, it used to have nominative and accusative cases, but later merged to form the direct case.

Nouns can be subdivided into four declensions. They are similar to the declension system in Latin:
 The first declension are all words on -a, the vast majority of which are feminine;
 the second declension are mostly masculine and neuter words ending with a consonant. It is a mixture of the second and fourth declension in Latin;
 the third declension are mostly feminine words ending with a soft consonant;
 the fourth declension are words on -ej, it matches the Latin fifth declension. However, the author treated the nouns with the 4th declension ending as irregular, see also the sections below.

Declension endings 

Hard and soft in this context are suffixes that are decided by final consonants, either hard (remaining consonants, like -n, -c, or -d) or soft (postalveolars or palatal-like sounds, like -l, -ń, or -rz). Endings in -ia-, -ie-, and -i- are always affected by regular changes below:

Irregular nouns 
There is a number of irregular nouns. Not just completely irregular nouns on the table below, some nouns have less predictable oblique stems (the rest stem other than nominative singular), as in above moszkieł, gen. moszklu. However, nouns with the last vowel ó regularly shorten to o (sórz, sorze).

{| class="wikitable"
! rowspan="2" |
! colspan="2" | dziew "god"
! colspan="2" | womień "person"2
! colspan="2" | kap "head"
|-
! Singular
! Plural
! Singular
! Plural
! Singular
! Plural
|-
! Direct
| dziew
| dziei
| womień
| ludzie
| kap
| kapta
|-
! Genitive
| dzieju
| dziejór
| womnie
| ludzi
| kapcie
| kaptór
|-
! Dative
| dziei
| dziejew
| womni
| ludziew
| kapci
| kapciew
|-
! rowspan="2" |
! colspan="2" | rzej "head"
! colspan="2" | dzej "day"
! Jezus "Jesus"
! rowspan="5" |
|-
! Singular
! Plural
! Singular
! Plural
! Singular
|-
! Direct
| rzej
| rzeje
| dzej
| dzeje
| Jezus
|-
! Genitive
| rzei
| rzejar
| dzei
| dzejór
| Jezu
|-
! Dative
| rzei
| rzejew| dzei| dzejew| Jezui|}

 Adjectives 
Adjectives always agree in gender, number and case with the noun they modify. They can be placed both before and after it. Unlike nouns, the adjective declension are always consistent and there is no distinctions in declension classes.

 Further derivatives of adjectives 
The comparatives and superlatives are formed by the suffixes -ierzy and -ieśmy, respectively, to the adjective's stem. However, the adjectives below have irregular comparative (second row) and superlative (third row) forms:
 bony "good", mielerzy, oćmy mały "bad", piejerzy, pieśmy grędzy "big", mojerzy, mośmy łonięcy "far", łonierzy, łonieśmy pieskły "small", mnierzy, mnieśmy wiekły "old", wieszczerzy, wieszcześmy jałty "high", sprzerzy, sprześmy mołt "many/much", pły "more", płerześmy "most"

Adverbial forms are either done by removing the -y/-i from the root or adding the suffix -mięć into the root (kłary, kłar/kłaramięć "warmly"). There are no rules which forms are preferred, but the latter usually expresses how something is done.

For the longer form, -amięć is used after hard consonants while -iemięć used after soft consonants. Adjectives in -ły use the suffix -lemięć (i.e. -ł- + -iemięć), except for the adjectives biały, mały, miły, siegły which are always suffixed with the former (biały → białamieć). The adjective bony "good" has an irregular adverbial derivation: bień. The comparatives and superlatives can also have adverbial forms, by substituting -ierzy and -ieśmy with -iu and -ieśmie. Verbal participles always remove their last vowels.

The predicative forms are the same as masculine and neuter direct singular forms, except that sometimes the suffix -y/-i is removed, but this predicative forming is somewhat archaic and the resulting forms should not be confused with adverbs.

 Pronouns 
Unlike nouns, adjectives and other pronouns, personal pronouns do not use the direct case, but preserve the distinction between the nominative and accusative instead. They are displayed in the following chart:

 Verbs 
Verbs are inflected for person, number, mood and tense. Because Latin and Proto-Slavonic had virtually identical person/number inflections, Venedic and Polish do also.

Venedic verbs have the following moods and tenses:infinitive – jemar "to love"present tense – jemu "I love, I am loving"imperfect – jemawa "I loved"perfect – jemie " I have loved"future tense (imperfective) – joru jemar "I will love, I will be loving"future tense (perfective) – jemaru "I will have loved"conditional mood – jemarsi "I would love, I would have loved"imperative mood – jem "love!"present active participle – jemęć "loving"perfect passive participle – jematy "beloved"

 Regular verbs 

 Word list 
Venedic vocabulary as published on the internet consists of over 4000 words. Because of how it was developed from Vulgar Latin, Venedic words are closest to Italian, but with phonologic differences from Italian which may be compared to those distinguishing Portuguese from Spanish. The following charts of 30 shows what Venedic looks like in comparison to a number of other Romance languages; note that unlike Brithenig, where one-quarter of the words resembled Welsh words, only four Venedic words (not counting szkoła, borrowed into Polish from Latin) resemble Polish words, due to the Slavic languages' greater distance from the Romance languages compared to the Celtic languages:

 Sample text 

The Lord's Prayer in Venedic:Potrze nostry, kwały jesz en czałór, sąciewkaty si twej numię.Owień twej rzeń.Foca si twa włątać, komód en czału szyk i sur cierze.Da nów odzej nostry pań kocidzany.I dziemieć nów nostrze dziewta, komód i nu dziemiećmy swór dziewtorzór.I nie endycz nosz en ciętaceń, uta liwra nosz dzie mału.Nąk twie są rzeń i pociestać i głurza, o siąprz. Amen.Article 1 of the Universal Declaration of Human Rights in Venedic:Tuci ludzie noszczę sie liwrzy i jekwali z rześpiece świej dzińtacie i swór drzecór. Li są dotaci ku rocenie i koszczęce i dziewię ocar piara wyniałtru en jenie frotrzeńtacie.Article 1 of the Universal Declaration of Human Rights in English:All human beings are born free and equal in dignity and rights. They are endowed with reason and conscience and should act towards one another in a spirit of brotherhood.Similar languages
In the Ill Bethisad universe, there are two other languages which are related to Venedic: Slevan, which is spoken in that universe's counterpart of Slovakia; and Šležan, or Silesian, spoken in Silesia. Šležan mirrors Czech   in much the same way Venedic does Polish, whereas Slevan, despite being located in Slovakia, is more similar to Hungarian and Croatian in its orthography. (The Romance "mirror" of Slovak is a dialect of Slevan spoken in Moravia called Moravľaňec.) (As if in compensation, Croatian in Ill Bethisad is forced to be noticeably different from Serbian by being made to resemble the now-virtually-missing Czech and Slovak.  )

Additionally, in the famous The Adventures of Tintin series, the fictional language Syldavian may be thought of as the Germanic counterpart of Venedic, showing what Polish might have looked like if it were a Germanic and not a Slavic language. The nearly extinct Wymysorys language provides another real-life example of this. Ill Bethisad also has such a "Slavo-Germanic" language: Bohemian, spoken in that universe's Czech Republic, developed by amateur Czech linguist Jan Havliš.

 Citations 
 Notes 

 References 

Bibliography
Tilman Berger, Vom Erfinden Slavischer Sprachen, in: M. Okuka & U. Schweier, eds., Germano-Slavistische Beiträge. Festschrift für P. Rehder zum 65. Geburtstag, München 2004, pp. 19–28. Cites Venedic as an example of Slavic-based extrapolated conlangs.
Michał Foerster, Wariacje literackie: o językach, in: Esencja, no. 07/2008 (LXXIX), August–September 2008.
Dorota Gut, : Now@ Mow@ ("New Language"), in: Wiedza i Życie, February 2004.
Jakub Kowalski, Wymyślone języki, on: Relaz.pl, 2 March 2007.
Stefan Michael Newerkla, "Auf den Spuren des ř in den slawischen Sprachen und rund um den Globus", in: Johannes Reinhart & Tilmann Reuther, eds., Ethnoslavica: Festschrift für Herrn Univ. Prof. Dr. Gerhard Neweklowsky zum 65. Geburtstag; Beiträge des internationalen Symposiums des Instituts für Slawistik der Universität Klagenfurt in Zusammenarbeit mit dem Institut für Slawistik der Universität Wien, Klagenfurt, 7.-8. April 2006, München-Wien: Otto Sagner, 2006, p. 212.
Paul J.J. Payack, A Million Words and Counting: How Global English Is Rewriting the World'', 2008, p. 193.
Romance glossary. A list of common words in all Romance languages, including Venedic and Brithenig.

External links
 Wenedyk 

Artistic languages
Fusional languages
Ill Bethisad
Constructed languages introduced in the 2000s
2002 introductions
Thought experiments
Constructed languages
Italo-Dalmatian languages